John MacBrady (died 1559) was an Irish prelate of the Roman Catholic Church.

MacBrady was appointed Bishop of Kilmore by Pope Paul III, in opposition to Edmund Nugent, on 5 November 1540. He was recognized by the crown in the reign of Queen Mary I. He died in 1559.

Notes

Year of birth unknown
1559 deaths
Roman Catholic bishops of Kilmore
16th-century Roman Catholic bishops in Ireland